MCMI may refer to: 

 Member of the Chartered Management Institute, the UK-based professional institution for managers. 
 Millon Clinical Multiaxial Inventory
 Roman numeral for 1901
 Marseille Center for Mediterranean Integration